Jorys Bovet (born 30 March 1993) is a French politician from the National Rally who was elected member of the National Assembly for Allier's 2nd constituency in the 2022 French legislative election.

References 

Living people
1993 births
Deputies of the 16th National Assembly of the French Fifth Republic
21st-century French politicians
National Rally (France) politicians